Kwasi Okyere Wriedt (born 10 July 1994) is a professional footballer who plays as a forward for 2. Bundesliga club Holstein Kiel. Born in Germany, he represents the Ghana national team.

Club career

Bayern Munich 
Wriedt made his debut for Bayern Munich on 25 October 2017, coming on as a substitute in the 101st minute for Thiago in an away match against RB Leipzig in the second round of the 2017–18 edition of the DFB-Pokal. The match finished 1–1 after extra time, with Bayern advancing after winning 5–4 in a penalty shoot-out.

Willem II 
On 1 July 2020, three days before the final match of the season, Wriedt joined Willem II on a three-year contract along with Bayern Munich II teammate Derrick Köhn.

Holstein Kiel 
Wriedt moved to 2. Bundesliga side Holstein Kiel on 20 January 2022, having agreed a contract until summer 2025.  Three days after signing for the club, he made his debut by coming on in the 74th minute for Benedikt Pichler in a 2–1 win Jahn Regensburg. He scored his debut goal on 11 February 2022, coming on in the 69th minute to score a 90th-minute winner in a 3–2 victory over Erzgebirge Aue.

International career 
Wriedt received his first call-up to the Ghana national team on 9 May 2018, ahead of friendlies against Japan and Iceland. He made his debut on 30 May 2018, coming on in the 82nd minute for Emmanuel Boateng in a 2–0 victory over Japan.

Career statistics

Club

Notes

International

Honours
Bayern Munich
DFL-Supercup: 2017, 2018
Bundesliga: 2017–18, 2018–19, 2019–20
DFB-Pokal: 2018–19

Bayern Munich II
3. Liga: 2019–20
Regionalliga Bayern: 2018–19

Individual
 3. Liga Player of the Season: 2019–20
 3. Liga top goalscorer: 2019–20

References

External links

 
 

1994 births
Living people
Citizens of Ghana through descent
Ghanaian footballers
German footballers
German sportspeople of Ghanaian descent
Footballers from Hamburg
Association football forwards
Ghana international footballers
Ghana under-20 international footballers
Lüneburger SK Hansa players
FC St. Pauli II players
VfL Osnabrück players
FC Bayern Munich II players
FC Bayern Munich footballers
Willem II (football club) players
Holstein Kiel players
Bundesliga players
2. Bundesliga players
Regionalliga players
3. Liga players
Eredivisie players
Ghanaian expatriate footballers
Ghanaian expatriate sportspeople in the Netherlands
Expatriate footballers in the Netherlands